Wonderland is the second album by metalcore band Sea of Treachery, released on December 14, 2010.

On October 7, 2010, the band announced that they had signed to BlkHeart Group and that their second album Wonderland would be released December 14, 2010.

In November 2010, BlkHeart Group released the album art for Wonderland and on November 16, the band released the album's first single, "A Lifetime Ago".

On December 3, 2010, the band released a second track from Wonderland, entitled "Who's Winning, You or You?" on their Facebook page.

The digital version of the album was released on January 4, 2011, and includes a bonus track; a re-recorded version of their cover of "Misery Business".

Track listing

Personnel 
Sea of Treachery
 Alex Huffman – lead vocals
 Voice Gajic – lead guitar
 Chris Simmons – rhythm guitar
 Chris Paterson – bass, keyboards, clean vocals, lead vocals on track 9
 Adam Pierce – drums, percussion

Production
 Tim Lambesis – producer

References 

2010 albums
Sea of Treachery albums